Thysanopeltis  is a genus of trilobite that lived from the Early to the Middle Devonian.  Its remains have been found in Africa and Europe.

Sources
Trilobite: Eyewitness to Evolution, by Richard Fortey
Trilobites, by Riccardo Levi-Setti

External links
Thysanopeltis in the Paleobiology Database

Styginidae
Corynexochida genera
Devonian trilobites of Africa
Devonian trilobites of Europe
Early Devonian first appearances
Middle Devonian genus extinctions